
Year 1539 (MDXXXIX) was a common year starting on Wednesday (link will display the full calendar) of the Julian calendar.

Events 
 January–June 
 January – Toungoo–Hanthawaddy War – Battle of Naungyo, Burma: The Toungoos decisively defeat the Hanthawaddys. 
 January 12 – Treaty of Toledo: Charles V, Holy Roman Emperor (and Charles I of Spain) and Francis I of France agree to make no further alliances with England. The treaty comes after Henry VIII of England's split with Rome and Pope Paul III.
 January 14 – Spain annexes Cuba.
 February 9 – The first horse race is held at Chester Racecourse, the oldest in use in England.
 March – Canterbury Cathedral surrenders, and reverts to its previous status of 'a college of secular canons'.
 May 30 – Hernando de Soto lands at Tampa Bay, Florida with 600 soldiers, with the goal of finding gold. He also introduces pigs into North America. 
 May – The Six Articles, an Act of the Parliament of England, reaffirms certain Catholic principles in Henry VIII's Church of England.
 June 26 – Battle of Chausa in modern-day Buxar, India: Sher Shah Suri defeats the Mughal emperor, Humayun  (Sher Shah goes on to form the Sur Empire, and take control of nearly all Mughal territory).

 July–December 
 August 15  – King Francis I of France issues the Ordinance of Villers-Cotterêt, that places the whole of France under the jurisdiction of the royal law courts, and makes French the language of those courts, and the official language of legal discourse.
 September 7 – Guru Angad Dev becomes the second Guru of the Sikhs.
 October 4 – Henry VIII contracts to marry Anne of Cleves.
 November 1 – Joachim II Hector introduces Lutheranism in the Margraviate of Brandenburg, becoming the second Prince-Elector after the Prince-Elector of Saxony to turn Protestant.
 November 26 – Abbot Marmaduke Bradley and 31 monks sign the deed surrendering Fountains Abbey to the English Crown. 

 Undated 
 Protestant Reformation
 Lutheranism is forcibly introduced into Iceland, despite the opposition of Bishop Jón Arason.
 Beaulieu Abbey, Bolton Abbey, Colchester Abbey, Newstead Abbey, St Albans Abbey, St Mary's Abbey, York and Hartland Abbey (the last) fall prey to the Dissolution of the Monasteries in England.
 The first edition of the Calvinist Genevan Psalter is published.
 In Henan province, China, a severe drought with swarms of locusts is made worse, by a major epidemic outbreak of the plague.
 The first printing press in North America is set up in Mexico City.
 Teseo Ambrogio's Introductio in Chaldaicam lingua, Syriaca atq Armenica, & dece alias linguas, published in Pavia, introduces several Middle Eastern languages to western Europe for the first time.

Births 

 January 28 – Nicolò Donato, Doge of Venice (d. 1618)
 February 13 – Elisabeth of Hesse, Electress Palatine by marriage (1576-1582) (d. 1582)
 February 23 
 Henry XI of Legnica, thrice Duke of Legnica (d. 1588)
 Salima Sultan Begum, Empress of the Mughal Empire as a wife of Emperor Akbar (d. 1613)
 February 27 – Franciscus Raphelengius, Dutch printer (d. 1597)
 March 5 – Christoph Pezel, German theologian (d. 1604)
 March 18 – Maria of Nassau, Countess of Nassau (d. 1599)
 April 5 – George Frederick, Margrave of Brandenburg-Ansbach (d. 1603)
 April 6 – Amalia of Neuenahr, German noble (d. 1602)
 April 7 
 Tobias Stimmer, Swiss artist (d. 1584)
 Strange Jørgenssøn, Norwegian businessman (d. 1610)
 April 30 – Archduchess Barbara of Austria, Austrian archduchess (d. 1572)
 May 22 – Edward Seymour, 1st Earl of Hertford (d. 1621)
 May 29 – Thomas Pounde, English Jesuit lay brother (d. 1613)
 June 6 – Catherine Vasa, Regent of East Frisia (1599-1610) (d. 1610)
 June 13 – Jost Amman, Swiss printmaker (d. 1591)
 June 23 – William Darrell of Littlecote, English politician (d. 1589)
 July 4 – Louis VI, Elector Palatine (d. 1583)
 September 18 – Louis Gonzaga, Duke of Nevers, Italian-French dignitary and diplomat (d. 1595)
 October 1 – Peter Vok, Czech noble (d. 1611)
 November 1 – Pierre Pithou, French lawyer and scholar (d. 1596)
 December 5 – Fausto Paolo Sozzini, Italian theologian (d. 1604)
 December 20 – Paulus Melissus, German composer (d. 1602)
 December 31 – John Radcliffe, English politician (d. 1568)
 date unknown
 José Luis Carvajal y de la Cueva, Portuguese explorer (d. 1590)
 Hasegawa Tōhaku, Japanese painter (d. 1610)
 Laurence Tomson, English Calvinist (d. 1608)
 Humphrey Gilbert, English adventurer, explorer, member of Parliament and soldier (d. 1583)

Deaths 

 January 24 – Anneke Esaiasdochter, Dutch Anabaptist writer (b. 1509)
 February – Narapati of Prome, king of Prome in Burma.
 February 6 – John III, Duke of Cleves (b. 1491)
 February 13 – Isabella d'Este, Marquise of Mantua (b. 1474)
 March 5 – Nuno da Cunha, Portuguese governor in India (b. 1487)
 March 12 – Thomas Boleyn, 1st Earl of Wiltshire, English diplomat and politician (b.1477)
 March 19 – Lord Edmund Howard, English nobleman (b. c. 1478))
 April 17 – George, Duke of Saxony (b. 1471)
 April 19 – Katarzyna Weiglowa, Jewish martyr (b. 1460)
 April 30 – John Bourchier, 1st Earl of Bath, English noble (b. 1470)
 May 1 – Isabella of Portugal, Holy Roman Empress (b. 1503)
 May 7 – Ottaviano Petrucci, Italian printer (b. 1466)
 May 7 or September 22 – Guru Nanak, founder of Sikhism (b. 1469)
 June 20 – Philip III, Count of Waldeck-Eisenberg (1524–1539) (b. 1486)
 July 5 – St Anthony Maria Zaccaria, Italian saint (b. 1502)
 July 9 – Adrian Fortescue, English Roman Catholic martyr (b. 1476)
 August – Vannoccio Biringuccio, Italian metallurgist (b. 1480)
 September 8 – John Stokesley, English prelate (b. 1475)
 November 14 – Hugh Cook Faringdon, English Abbot of Reading
 December 12 – Bartolomeo degli Organi, Italian musician (b. 1474)
 December 20 – Johannes Lupi, Flemish composer (b. c. 1506)
 date unknown 
 James Beaton, Scottish church leader (b. 1473)
 Cura Ocllo, Inca queen

References